Phtheochroa kenyana is a species of moth of the family Tortricidae. It is found in Kenya.

The wingspan is about 15 mm for males and 20 mm for females.

Etymology
The species is named for Kenya, the country where the species was collected.

References

Endemic moths of Kenya
Moths described in 2010
Phtheochroa